Fakfak Torea Airport , also known as Fak Fak Airport, is an airport serving Fakfak, located in the province of West Papua in Indonesia.

Facilities

Airlines and destinations

References

External links
 

Airports in West Papua (province)